Sandra Marinello (born 29 May 1983) is a German badminton player. She was born in Duisburg, and started to playing badminton in 1995. Marinello was part of the 1. BC Düren from 2008-2014, and previously plays for the SV Thomasstadt Kempen, BV RW Wesel, TV Remscheid, SCU Lüdinghausen, PSV Ludwigshafen, and BV Gifhorn. She won the women's doubles title at the national championships from 2009-2012 partnered with Birgit Overzier. Together with the German national women's team, she won the bronze medal at the 2006 Uber Cup in Japan. She also won the women's doubles bronze at the 2012 European Championships with Overzier.

Achievements

European Championships
Women's doubles

BWF Grand Prix 
The BWF Grand Prix has two levels: Grand Prix and Grand Prix Gold. It is a series of badminton tournaments, sanctioned by the Badminton World Federation (BWF) since 2007.

Women's doubles

 BWF Grand Prix Gold tournament
 BWF Grand Prix tournament

BWF International Challenge/Series
Women's doubles

Mixed doubles

 BWF International Challenge tournament
 BWF International Series/European Circuit tournament

References

External links 

Portrait

1983 births
Living people
Sportspeople from Duisburg
German female badminton players